The following lists events that happened during 1954 in Laos.

Incumbents
Monarch: Sisavang Vong 
Prime Minister: Souvanna Phouma (until 25 October), Katay Don Sasorith (starting 25 October)

Events

August
 August 1 - The First Indochina War ends with the Vietnam People's Army in North Vietnam, the Vietnamese National Army in South Vietnam, the Kingdom of Cambodia in Cambodia, and the Kingdom of Laos in Laos, emerging victorious against the French Army.

December
 December 24 - Laos gains full independence from France.

References

 
1950s in Laos
Years of the 20th century in Laos
Laos
Laos